Let's Go Pocoyo! is a Spanish preschool interactive comedy computer animated television series which is the third series of Pocoyo. It debuted in 2010 on TVE's Clan channel.

Premise
Beside the show about Pocoyo having an adventure and always learning something at the end, there are also recurring segments such as:
Surfing the Net with Elly - Pocoyo asks Elly to search up two subjects on the internet. After looking up the subjects, Pocoyo thanks Elly for looking them up.
Wheel of Colours/Colors - Pocoyo, Pato and Elly search for objects of a certain colour using their cameras. The game show ends with the three taking a picture of the last colored thing, with the narrator saying "Hooray for (certain colour name)" 
A Quiet Moment with Sleepy Bird - Set to the music of Bach's Goldberg Variations Aria, Pocoyo shows Sleepy Bird pictures of objects and screams them out loud, waking Sleepy Bird up. On the last thing, Pocoyo shows Sleepy Bird quietly and then shouts it out, which it ends with Sleepy Bird annoyed and goes back to sleep.
Professor Pato - Professor Pato tries to teach the younger characters Baby Bird, Caterpillar and Angry Alien a certain subject, ending with one of the students (mostly Angry Alien) screaming in his face, causing the blackboard to fall on him. The narrator ends the segment with the approval stamp and tagline: "Lesson approved by Professor Pato." 
Fred Says - Fred gets everyone to do what he says in his version of "Simon Says". They are usually 3 things that Fred says what everyone has to do. The segment usually ends with Pocoyo, Pato and Elly dashing away, the water gets filled back up (like at the beginning and then gets drained at the end of the opening), and with Fred making a raspberry face with the narrator says "Fred Says: That's all!"
The Martian Brothers Show — The Martian Brothers dance around three objects which changes. On the last thing, sometimes a Martian Brother eats a piece of the object. And the segment ends with the narrator showing the three objects that the Martian Brothers danced around.
Animals Dot-to-Dot - Pocoyo tries to figure out a dot-to-dot animal picture. At the end, Pocoyo understands what animal it is and the segment ends with the animal making their personal noise.
Shape Shuffle - Pocoyo uses three shapes to make an object. At the end, the narrator explains the three shapes and then the segment ends with a slideshow.
Number Menu - Pato orders a food of a certain number for him and an orange alien and Pocoyo has to serve it. When he does for the first time however, the alien eats both his and Pato's food, to which Pocoyo has him order another food of the same number, which not only the orange alien eats, but the entire table too. In the end, Pato is upset until the alien gives him some hearts the same number as before, making him happy.
Pocoyo's Fairytales - Pocoyo shows the viewers a made-up fairytale story about a dinosaur and an ant related to the subject of the episode.
Let's Sing! - At the end of every episode before the end credits, a short song related to the episode plays to sign off the episode. The song has two verses and in the middle of the song, some objects appear with the children saying the name of each object.

Episodes

(2010)

 1: Pocoyo's Band — (3 Jul 2010) Pocoyo recruits Elly & Pato to be in a band with him but they all play out of tune.
 2: Picnic — (5 Jul 2010) Someone is stealing the sandwiches at Pocoyo and his friends' picnic.
 3: Pato's Shower — (8 Jul 2010) Pocoyo, Elly, and Baby Bird & Caterpillar steal the soap, brush and towel from Pato and he needs them to take a shower, so his friends make amends with him by helping him with his shower.
 4: The Garden — (10 Jul 2010) Pocoyo wants to grow a flower just like Pato. But he doesn't want his ducky friend to help him and so the seed becomes a small weed.
 5: Pato the Postman — (13 Jul 2010) Pato becomes the postman but his friends tire him out with the frequent deliveries.
 6: Colours — (15 Jul 2010) Four coloured blocks visit Pocoyo.
 7: Ready, Steady, Go! — (18 Jul 2010) Pocoyo, Pato, and Elly are having a race first by running, then taking their scooters, and then their cars. In the end, they come in a tie when they decide to run again.
 8: Camping — (20 Jul 2010) Pocoyo and friends go camping with their tent, hammock, and sleeping bag. When they hear a strange noise, they discover that it's just Sleepy Bird's snoring.
 9: Space Mission — (23 Jul 2010) Pocoyo & Pato play with their little alien friend by taking him home in a cardboard rocket. 
 10: Travel with Pato — (25 Jul 2010)  Pato's forgot to bring his suitcase for his vacation and when Pocoyo & Elly bring it to him, they discover that they're also going with Pato too.
 11: Playtime — (28 Jul 2010) Pocoyo gets out his toybox and when his friends want to play with them, he steals them back, wanting to play alone. Soon, he learns that it wasn't a very nice thing to do, so he makes up with his friends
 12: Tennis for everyone — (30 Jul 2010) Caterpillar wants to play tennis with her friends but they say that she's too little to play. So Caterpillar gives them a surprise attack for being mean to her.
 13: Hide And Seek — (2 Aug 2010) Pocoyo is playing hide-and-seek with his friends and by the time he finds them, they surprise him with a party.
 14: Party Time — (4 Aug 2010) Pocoyo & his friends are throwing a party. Fred wants to help too. Soon, Fred discovers that the party is for his birthday.
 15: Wheels — (7 Aug 2010) Pocoyo, Pato, and Elly are riding their bike, scooter, and skateboard. Caterpillar wants to join too but she is too small so her friends give her a ride on their rides.
 16: Elly's Bath — (9 Aug 2010) Pocoyo wants to play with Elly but she is having a bath. When Elly is done, Pocoyo wants to join her in the bath too.
 17: The Amazing Tower — (12 Aug 2010) Pato is building a tall tower out of blocks but he doesn't want to share his blocks with Pocoyo. So they decide to make a compromise and build a tower together.
 18: A Hole in One — (14 Aug 2010) Elly is golfing and Pocoyo wants to golf too but he doesn't know how. So Elly teaches him to play and Pocoyo manages to get a hole in one.
 19: Bathing Loula — (17 Aug 2010) Loula gets so dirty that Pocoyo & Elly have to wash her but Loula doesn't want to. When they manage to wash her a 2nd time after she got dirty after the 1st time, Pocoyo gets rid of the mud puddle to keep Loula from getting dirty again. But, now Pocoyo needs a bath.
 20: Elly's Market — (19 Aug 2010) Elly opens up a fruit market but Pocoyo & Pato accidentally destroy the fruit stands so Elly tells them to fix it.
 21: Cooking With Elly — (4 Sep 2010) Elly is making a birthday cake for Caterpillar but Pocoyo and Pato accidentally destroys it. So Elly forces them to make a new cake. Pocoyo & Pato have to understand where the fridge and oven are. And when they were finished, Caterpillar ate the whole cake and didn't share. So they had to start all over again.
 22: Magic Fingers — (6 Sep 2010) Pocoyo amazes Pato, Caterpillar and Baby Bird with a disappearing trick involving his fingers, arm and foot.
 23: Pato's Bedtime — (9 Sep 2010) Pato is ready for bed but Pocoyo wants to play.
 24: Pocoyo's New Toys — (11 Sep 2010) Pocoyo wants to try the hula hoop, jump rope, and kite but he's awful at them. So his friends help him.
 25: Pocoyo's Camera — (14 Sep 2010) Pocoyo takes pictures of his friends' embarrassing moments but they aren't happy with him.
 26: Painting With Pocoyo — (16 Sep 2010) Baby Bird learns about a still life painting but accidentally eats the fruit for it.
 27: Playing Dress Up — (19 Sep 2010) Caterpillar wants to join her friends' dress up play but she is too short for anything so her friends help her.
 28: Magic Box — (21 Sep 2010) Pocoyo has 2 magic boxes and tests it with Pato's ball.
 29: Pocoyo's Restaurant — (24 Sep 2010) Pocoyo & Elly run a restaurant and serve the Angry Alien watermelon. When he is finished, he brings his friends with him to the restaurant.
 30: Wake Up Pocoyo! — (26 Sep 2010) Pato tries to wake up Pocoyo who is too tired to do so. When Pocoyo is awake, now Pato is the one tired.
 31: Ahoy, Pocoyo — (29 Sep 2010) Pocoyo & Pato play pirates and journey to find a treasure chest.
 32: Elly's Computer — (1 Oct 2010) Pocoyo wants to play with Elly but she is playing a videogame on her computer. When she beats the game, she now goes to play with Pocoyo.
 33: Going To The Beach — (4 Oct 2010) Pocoyo & Pato read a postcard about Elly's beach vacation and want to visualize it in the sandbox.
 34: Big And Small — (6 Oct 2010) Pocoyo finds a remote control that has 2 buttons: one to enlarge and one to shrink. When he tries it on his friends' things, they're upset with him so he reverses everything.
 35: Face Painting — (9 Oct 2010) Elly want Pocoyo & Pato to paint her new doll but they end up painting each of the doll's body parts instead.
 36: Supermarket — (11 Oct 2010) Pocoyo & Pato run a supermarket and Elly calls in to order a can, carton, or bottle. When she makes one more call to them, she surprises them with a party.
 37: Elly's Playhouse — (14 Oct 2010) Elly builds a playhouse for herself but Pocoyo & Pato destroy it by accident so Elly forces them to repair it.
 38: Pocoyo's Puppet Theater — (16 Oct 2010) Pocoyo and Elly make a puppet show at their puppet theater and want Pato to be their audience.
 39: Up And Down — (19 Oct 2010) Pocoyo teaches Baby Bird about up and down but then he wants him to teach Caterpillar about up and down too.
 40: Pocoyo's Breakfast — (21 Oct 2010) Pocoyo would rather have breakfast with his other friends than having breakfast with Elly.
 41: Traffic Jam — (24 Oct 2010) Pocoyo runs a traffic intersection but Baby Bird, Caterpillar, and the Angry Alien don't understand him.
 42: Pato's Living Room — (26 Oct 2010) Pato wants to be alone in his living room than invite his friends in.
 43: Cinema — (5 Nov 2010) Pato runs a cinema and invites his friends to see his movie, but gets really upset when the projector messes up his movie.
 44: Elly's New Doll — (7 Nov 2010) Elly gets a new doll and wants Pocoyo and Pato to look after it.
 45: Circus — (10 Nov 2010) Pocoyo, Pato & Elly run a circus and perform amazing acts for their friends.
 46: The Best Bedroom — (12 Nov 2010) Pocoyo and his friends compete for the best bedroom.
 47: Pocoyo Goes To School — (15 Nov 2010) Elly wants her friends to come to her school. Baby Bird & Caterpillar want to go but Pocoyo & Pato don't want to.
 48: Art — (17 Nov 2010) Pocoyo, Elly, and Baby Bird & Caterpillar display their artwork in a museum but Pato doesn't like any of them.
 49: Pocoyo Recycles — (20 Nov 2010) Pocoyo & his friends learn about recycling.
 50: Down on The Farm — (22 Nov 2010) Someone is stealing the vegetables in the garden.
 51: Nurse Elly — (25 Nov 2010) Elly wants her friends to tidy up but Pocoyo wants to keep playing so he pretends to be sick so that he doesn't have to clean. Unfortunately, his friends take it too seriously.
 52: Fishing With Pocoyo — (27 Nov 2010) Pocoyo & Pato are fishing but they keep getting old junk from the ocean.

2010 Spanish television series debuts
2013 Spanish television series endings
Computer-animated television series
Spanish children's animated comedy television series
Spanish-language television shows
Animated television series spinoffs
Animated preschool education television series
2010s preschool education television series
Animated television series about children